Handlová (before 1913 ) is a town in the Prievidza District, Trenčín Region in the middle of Slovakia. It is made up of the three parts Handlová, Nová Lehota and Morovno.

Geography
It is located in the Handlovka brook valley, surrounded by the mountain ranges of Vtáčnik in the west and Žiar in the south, east and north, in the historical region of Hauerland.

Besides the main settlement, it also has "parts" of Morovno (north-west) and Nová Lehota (south), both annexed 1976.

History
The town was established in 1376 and was inhabited by German settlers which were later known as the Carpathian Germans. The first known settler in Handlová was Peter Kricker from Kremnica, who came here together with 200 others to establish a settlement on a site called Krásny les (Beautiful Forest). At first the settlers lived just from crops and pastoral farming. Only much later, in the 18th century, did coal mining begin. Local miners at first worked mainly to supply the needs of nearby Bojnice Castle.

In 1945 after World War II, Handlová underwent the biggest upheaval in its centuries-long history. Most of its ethnic German inhabitants was expelled from the town due to the so-called Beneš decrees. Of the original 12,800 people who lived here as late as in 1943, only 4,000 remained in Handlová by 1945. As a result, Handlová's character changed completely. It received town privileges in 1960.

In 2009, the town suffered a major disaster during the 2009 Handlová mine blast, in which 20 people were killed.

Demographics
According to the 2001 census, the town had 18,018 inhabitants. 96.14% of inhabitants were Slovaks, 0.85% Hungarian, 0.67% Czechs and 0.24% Germans. The religious make-up was 46.10% Atheists, 44.74% Roman Catholics and 2.42% Lutherans.

People
Peter Paliatka, designer, sculptor and university pedagogue
Martin Škrtel, Slovak footballer

Twin towns – sister cities

Handlová is twinned with:
 Konopiska, Poland
 Sárisáp, Hungary
 Voerde, Germany
 Zábřeh, Czech Republic

See also
 List of municipalities and towns in Slovakia

References

Genealogical resources

The records for genealogical research are available at the state archive "Statny Archiv in Nitra, Slovakia"

 Roman Catholic church records (births/marriages/deaths): 1642-1939 (parish A)
 Lutheran church records (births/marriages/deaths): 1735-1950 (parish B)

External links

 
 Surnames of living people in Handlová

Cities and towns in Slovakia
Villages and municipalities in Prievidza District